The 2022–23 EHF Champions League is the 63rd edition of Europe's premier club handball tournament and the 30th edition under the current EHF Champions League format. It runs from 14 September 2022 to 18 June 2023.

Format
The tournament will run using the same format as the previous two seasons. The competition begins with a group stage featuring sixteen teams divided into two groups. Matches are played in a double round-robin system with home-and-away fixtures, fourteen in total for each team. In Groups A and B, the top two teams automatically qualify for the quarter-finals, with teams ranked 3rd to 6th entering the playoff round.

The knockout stage includes four rounds: the playoffs, quarter-finals, and a final-four tournament comprising two semifinals and the final. In the playoffs, eight teams are paired against each other in two-legged home-and-away matches (third-placed in group A plays sixth-placed group B; fourth-placed group A plays fifth-placed group B, etc.). The four aggregate winners of the playoffs advance to the quarterfinals, joining the top-two teams of Groups A and B. The eight quarterfinalist teams are paired against each other in two-legged home-and-away matches, with the four aggregate winners qualifying to the final-four tournament. 

In the final four tournament, the semifinals and the final are played as single matches at a pre-selected host venue. For this tournament, it will be the Lanxess Arena.

Teams
There are ten guaranteed places, with the six additional spots being awarded as wildcards by the EHF. The league winners of Germany, France, Spain, Hungary, Denmark, North Macedonia, Poland, Portugal and Romania will qualify for the group stage automatically. 22 teams applied for a place. Teams which have qualified for the 2022–23 EHF European League will have the opportunity to apply for an upgrade to the EHF Champions League. The final list was announced in June 2022.

 RK Vardar, who were originally to qualify as winners of the  2021–22 Macedonian Handball Super League, were removed from EHF competitions for this season due to financial issues.

Group stage

The draw for the group stage was held on 1 July 2022. The 16 teams were drawn into four groups of four. From each pot, two teams were drawn into Group A and the other two in Group B. Teams from the same national association will not drawn into the same group.

A total of 11 national associations were represented in the group stage.

Group A

Group B

Knockout stage

Playoffs

Quarterfinals

Final four
The final four will be held at the Lanxess Arena in Cologne, Germany on 17 and 18 June 2023.

Bracket

Final

Top goalscorers

References

External links
Official website

 
2022
EHF Champions League
EHF Champions League
EHF Champions League
EHF Champions League